Aneesa O'Brien (born 27 April 2002) is an footballer who plays as a goalkeeper for the Jacksonville State Gamecocks. Born in Canada, she represents the Guyana women's national team.

College career
O'Brien committed to the Jacksonville State University in the United States. She made her college debut for the Jacksonville State Gamecocks on March 5, 2021, against the Southeast Missouri State Redhawks recording five saves in a 3–1 loss. She was named to the 2021 FTF All-Freshman Second Team.

International career
Internationally, O'Brien represents Guyana, the nation of her mother's birth, after having been introduced to the program by her friend and Guyana international player Nailah Rowe.

At senior level, she made her debut in 2018 at the 2018 CFU Women's Challenge Series, at the age of 15, playing against Suriname and Trinidad and Tobago.

In 2019, O'Brien first represented Guyana U20 at the 2020 CONCACAF Women's U-20 Championship qualification tournament, appearing in four games, recording three clean sheet. She later represent them at the 2020 CONCACAF Women's U-20 Championship.

External links
Aneesa O'Brien JSU Gamecocks profile

See also
List of Guyana women's international footballers

References

2002 births
Living people
Citizens of Guyana through descent
Guyanese women's footballers
Women's association football goalkeepers
Guyana women's international footballers
FC Oshawa players
Black Canadian women's soccer players
Canadian sportspeople of Guyanese descent
Jacksonville State Gamecocks athletes